Gröne is a German surname. Notable people with the surname include:

 Bernd Gröne (born 1963), German cyclist
 Valentin Gröne (1817–1882), German Catholic theologian

See also
 LaGrone

German-language surnames